Lille-Saint-Sauveur is a former goods station of Lille with some of the buildings has been converted into recreational areas and exhibition on the occasion of the events of Lille 3000 in 2009.

History
Ten years after the opening of the first railway station of Lille, Lille-Flandres station in 1848, the city annexed the neighboring towns of Moulins, Wazemmes, Fives, and Esquermes. That was when the idea of building a larger station in the south emerged. The new station was created in 1861 by imperial decree, and construction finished in 1864. Station Fives-Saint-Sauveur was initially supposed to become the main train station in Lille, but due to its location, which then seemed relatively far from the historical center, eventually led to a freight station.

After entering into service of multimodal Dourges Delta 3, the station stopped its activities in 2001 and Sernam ceased to operate in December 2003. This raised the question of how to convert the 20 acres it occupies. The project is not yet finalized, but in 2008 the rehabilitation work of two of its halls have been undertaken as part of the organization of events in 2009 Lille 3000:

The building, which dates from the nineteenth century, now houses a bar, a restaurant and a cinema.
The building, constructed during the 1920s, was converted into an exhibition space and event planning.

Martine Aubry, mayor of Lille, announced her candidacy for president in this former train station.

Railway stations in France opened in 1848
Railway stations closed in 2003
Buildings and structures in Lille
Transport in Lille
Defunct railway stations in Nord (French department)